Jeon Ok (April 2, 1911 – October 22, 1969) was a Korean actress and singer. Jeon was referred to as "Queen of Tears" for her excellence at acting for tragic dramas.

Biography
Jeon Ok was born Jeon Deok-rye in Hamhung, South Hamgyong province, now part of North Korea, in 1911, during the Japanese colonial period. When Jeon was 15 years old, she was introduced to the film industry by her brother. Jeon aspired to be an actress in Towolhoe (토월회), her debut role was as a supporting actress in the 1927 film Jal itgeora (잘 있거라), directed by Na Woon-gyu. Jeon gained popularity after taking a lead role in Arirang Gogae (아리랑고개), based on Park Seung-hui (박승희) and produced by Towolhoe. However, when the theatre closed, she moved to Joseon Yeongeuksa in 1930. Jeon was noted for her monologues as well as her tragic performances which often brought audiences to tears, so she was dubbed the "Queen of Tragedy" or "Queen of Tears". After the liberation of Korea, Jeon was mainly active in film.

Personal life
Jeon Ok married Kang Hong-shik, an actor, film director and singer. Kang Hong-shik and Jeon Ok were the first married couple in Korean entertainment history. Their daughters, Kang Hyo-shil and Kang Hyo-son, became their parents' step. Later, Jeon and Kang divorced. Kang went over to North Korea along with Hyo-son who later became a famous actress in North Korea. Kang Hong-shik was honored as "Merited artist" as well. Meanwhile, Hyo-sil married Choi Moo-ryong, a popular actor of the 1960s and 1970s. Choi then had an affair with Kim Ji-mee, the most popular Korean actress of that time, so that Choi and Kang divorced in 1962. Jeon's grandson is Choi Min-soo between Choi Moo-ryong and Hyo-shil, who is also a famous active actor.

Jeon met her second husband Choe Il, who was a former football coach of Pyongyang Football Team and also engaged in her entertainment business when she reestablished Namhae yeneungdae (남해예능대) into (백조가극단) in 1946.

Jeon ran an orchid in Deoksong-ri, Byeollae-myeon, Yangju, Gyeonggi province. Jeon died of her chronic diseases, high blood pressure, kidney failure on October 22, 1969.

Filmography
*Note; the whole list is referenced.

Awards
1958, Korean Stage Art Association Awards (한국무대예술원상)

References

External links

1911 births
1969 deaths
20th-century Korean actresses
South Korean film actresses
People from Hamhung
Korean film actresses